The Bulgarian Hound (Balgarski Barak), also known as the Barak, is a hunting breed from Bulgaria. This breed is prevalent in the north, northwestern and central regions of Bulgaria. Its closest relative is the Slovak Rough-haired Pointer.

Breed standard 
The Barak belongs to the lineage of long-haired hounds first described by F.Laszka in 1905, and is the only long-haired hound breed in this region.

The Bulgarian Hound breed standard of the Bulgarian Republican Federation of Cynology places this dog in group 6 - “Scenthounds and similar breeds”, section 1.2 - “Medium-sized scenthounds”. The breed is not recognized by FCI.

The Bulgarian Hound is a scenthound with medium height. Its body is balanced, strong, with a rectangular outline. The coarse coat is yellow-rufous coloured in various shades, halm yellow or dark rufous. The coat can be in one colour or combined with grey or black-grey in the middle part of the body. Some white spots are acceptable in definite places.

Lineage
In 2020, a mitochondrial DNA study found that a dog specimen found in the Bronze Age town of Via Ordiere, Solarolo, Italy dated to 3,600–3,280 years ago shared a DNA sequence (haplotype) that is found in the Bulgarian Hound. Additionally, almost all of the ancient Bulgarian specimens in the study shared haplotypes with ancient Italian samples.

See also
 Dogs portal
 List of dog breeds
Bulgarian Scenthound (native Bulgarian dog)
Karakachan dog (native Bulgarian dog)

References 

Dog breeds originating in Bulgaria
Scent hounds